CJPX-FM is a French-language Canadian radio station located in Montreal, Quebec. Owned and operated by Leclerc Communication, it broadcasts on 99.5 MHz using an omnidirectional antenna on Mount Royal with an effective radiated power of 8,700 watts (class B).

It was previously owned and operated by Groupe Musique Greg, fronted by Montreal musician and radio personality Gregory Charles. Its main studios were located in Parc Jean-Drapeau on Île Notre-Dame in the middle of the Saint Lawrence River.

History 

The station had a classical music commercial format at its inception on June 25, 1998. The station was the first successful commercial classical music station in Montreal, following the failure of CJRM-FM in 1968 and decades of reluctance since then by the CRTC to allow such a station to go on the air. It was conceived in the 'Top 40 classics' style of Radio Classique in France, or Classic FM in the UK.

In December 2014, it was announced that CJPX and its Quebec City sister station CJSQ-FM would be sold to Groupe Musique Greg, a company founded by Charles. Charles' offer to buy the two stations came in response to rumours that former owner Jean-Pierre Coallier was looking to retire and sell them.

The station was the only 24-hour source of mostly classical music in Montreal – including some jazz, with the two national CBC FM networks, Ici Musique and CBC Music, switching around 2009 to a mix of classical, jazz, adult alternative and other genres. CJPX-FM did mix in some occasional jazz, film music and chansons, in a limited amount.

In 2015, retired former Le Téléjournal news anchor Bernard Derome joined the station as a morning host.  Other personalities include Charles, Marie-Ève Lamonde, François Paré and Marc Hervieux, plus Béatrice Zacharie and Jasmin Hains, both broadcasting from CJSQ-FM in Quebec City.

On April 3, 2020, the CRTC approved the sale of CJPX-FM to Leclerc Communication for $4.89 million. Leclerc Communication had previously tried to acquire CKLX-FM and CHOI-FM from RNC Media, but called off the sale when the CRTC required it to divest a station. The new owner replaced the classical music programming with an adult contemporary one, branded as WKND 99.5, in a similar format to Quebec City's sister station CJEC-FM. Radio-Classique went off air on June 13, 2020.

References

External links 
 
 
 

Jpx
Jpx
Jpx
Radio stations established in 1998
1998 establishments in Quebec